Alexandr Trush (born 26 June 1989) is a Ukrainian principal dancer of the Hamburg Ballet.

Alexandr Trush was born in Dnipropetrovsk, Ukraine, and began folk dancing lessons there. At the age of 12 his family moved to Germany and he continued his training at the School of the Hamburg Ballet with Kevin Haigen. He joined the Hamburg Ballet in 2007 and was promoted to soloist in 2010 and principal dancer in 2014.

Repertoire
Ballets by John Neumeier
 Giselle (after Jean Coralli and Jules Perrot): Albert
 The Nutcracker: Günther, Fritz
 Illusions – like 'Swan Lake''' (utilizing choreography by Marius Petipa and Lev Ivanov): Count Alexander
 Nijinsky: Arlequin/Spirit of the Rose, Léonide Massine
 Le Pavillon d’Armide: Vaslav Nijinsky, Vaslav Nijinsky as a Student (first interpreter)
 A Midsummer Night's Dream: Philostrat/Puck, Lysander
 Romeo and Juliet: Romeo
 Othello: Cassio
 As You Like It: Le Beau
 The Lady of the Camellias: Des Grieux, Count N.
 Tatiana: Vladimir Lensky (first interpreter)
  Liliom: Louis, Shy Young Man (first interpreter)
 Death in Venice: Tadzio
 A Streetcar Named Desire: Allan Gray
 Daphnis and Chloe: Daphnis
 Orpheus: Shadow of Hermes (first interpreter)
 The Legend of Joseph: Joseph 
 Christmas Oratorio: Angel
 Saint Matthew Passion Duse: The Soldier (Luciano Nicastro) (first interpreter)
 The Third Symphony of Gustav Mahler The Fourth Symphony of Gustav Mahler The Song of the Earth: The Man (first interpreter at the Hamburg Ballet)
 Kinderszenen Turangalȋla (world premiere)

Ballets by other choreographers
 La Sylphide (choreography: Pierre Lacotte): Scottish pas de deux
 Napoli (choreography: Lloyd Riggins, after August Bournonville): Gennaro
 Onegin (choreography: John Cranko): Lensky
 The Prodigal Son (choreography: George Balanchine): title role (first interpreter at the Hamburg Ballet)
 Dances at a Gathering (choreography: Jerome Robbins): Man in Brick (first interpreter at the Hamburg Ballet)
 The Concert (choreography: Jerome Robbins): The Shy Boy
 Renku'' (choreography: Yuka Oishi and Orkan Dann; world premiere)

References

External links
 Alexandr Trusch's page on the Hamburg Ballet website

1989 births
Living people
Ukrainian male ballet dancers
Principal dancers
People from Dnipro
People from Hamburg